The Japanese government has established National Research and Development Agencies that fall under the Ministry of Education, Culture, Sports, Science and Technology (MEXT).

 National Institute for Materials Science (NIMS)
 RIKEN
 National Institute of Advanced Industrial Science and Technology (AIST) and National Metrology Institute of Japan (NMIJ)
 Japan Aerospace Exploration Agency (JAXA)
 National Institutes for Quantum Science and Technology (QST)
 National Institute of Genetics (NIG)
  National Institute for Basic Biology (NIBB)
 National Institute of Informatics (NII)
 National Institute of Public Health (NIPH)
 National Center for Global Health and Medicine (NCGM)
 National Cancer Center (NCC)
 National Institute of Information and Communications Technology (NICT)
 National Institute of Infectious Diseases (NIID)
 National Institute for Defense Studies (NIDS)
 National Institute of Science and Technology Policy (NISTEP)
 National Institute for Materials Science (NIMS)
 National Institutes of Biomedical Innovation, Health and Nutrition (NIBIOHN)

See also
 Independent Administrative Institution

References

Research and development in Japan